Varto is a town and district in Muş Province, Turkey.

The population of Varto city is around 13,000 with another 17,000 living in the villages.

The largest population from Varto in Europe is in Berlin.

History

Some 5,200 Armenians were living in the district of Varto in 1914, including 600 in the town of Varto. Eight churches, 3 monasteries and 5 schools tended to their to spiritual needs. In June 1915 during the Armenian genocide, a great number of Varto's Armenians were massacred in the valley of Newala Ask.

Varto was the site of major fighting during the Sheikh Said rebellion in 1924, and was the epicenter of the 1966 earthquake that killed nearly 3,000 people.

In the 1990s Varto was one of the hotbeds of Kurdish militancy led by the Kurdistan Workers' Party (PKK). Although the city did not see ongoing battles, it was the hometown of many fighters and leading PKK commanders. The Turkish military garrison stationed in the city is surrounded by barbed wire and sandbags. The garrison patrols the city in armored personnel carriers (cars), though there was no fighting in or around the city since the 1990s until August 2015 when fighting between Turkish security forces and PKK began again. Most Kirmancki Kurdish language speakers are Alevis, whereas most Kurmanci Kurdish language speakers are Sunnis. The communities had a separate and quiet existence until the 1980s. There are about a hundred villages in the Varto district.

Politics 
The former mayor Sabite Ekinci Peace and Democracy Party (BDP), was arrested on 9 November 2016 on charges of "being a member of a terrorist organization" and removed from her duty. District Governor Mehmet Nuri Çetin was appointed as trustee in her stead. The current mayor Ülkü Karaaslan was elected in the local elections in March 2019  and as district governor, Ertuğrul Avci was appointed.

References

Further reading
De Bellaigue, Christopher, Rebel Land: Among Turkey's Forgotten Peoples. London: Bloomsbury, 2009.

External links 
Vartositesi.com

Populated places in Muş Province
Districts of Muş Province
Towns in Turkey
Kurdish settlements in Turkey